Janet Lees Price (19 April 1943 – 22 May 2012) was a British actress who appeared in television programmes including: Emergency – Ward 10, Z-Cars, The First Lady, Softly, Softly, Dixon of Dock Green, Upstairs, Downstairs, Within These Walls, Blake's 7, By the Sword Divided, The Bill and Agatha Christie's Poirot.

She was married to actor Paul Darrow, best known for his role as Kerr Avon in the BBC's science-fiction television series Blake's 7. She died on 22 May 2012 after a long illness.

References

External links
 

1943 births
British television actresses
British soap opera actresses
2012 deaths